In usage in the Southern United States, a bayou is a body of water typically found in a flat, low-lying area. It may refer to an extremely slow-moving stream, river (often with a poorly defined shoreline), marshy lake, wetland, or creek. They typically contain brackish water highly conducive to fish life and plankton. Bayous are commonly found in the Gulf Coast region of the southern United States, especially in the Mississippi River Delta, though they also exist elsewhere.

A bayou is often an anabranch or minor braid of a braided channel that is slower than the mainstem, often becoming boggy and stagnant. Though fauna varies by region, many bayous are home to crawfish, certain species of shrimp, other shellfish, catfish, frogs, toads, salamanders, newts, American alligators, American crocodiles, herons, lizards, turtles, tortoises, spoonbills, snakes, and leeches, as well as many other species.

Etymology
The word entered American English via Louisiana French in Louisiana and is thought to originate from the Choctaw word bayuk, which means "small stream". After first appearing in the 17th century, the term is found in 18th century accounts and maps, often as bayouc or bayouque, where it was eventually shortened to its current form. The first settlements of the Bayou Têche and other bayous were founded by the Louisiana Creoles, and the bayous are commonly associated with Creole and Cajun culture.

An alternative spelling, "buyou", is also known to have been in use, as in "Pine Buyou", used in a description by Congress in 1833 of Arkansas Territory.

Geography
The term Bayou Country is most closely associated with Cajun and Creole cultural groups derived from French settlers and stretching along the Gulf Coast from Houston, Texas, to Mobile, Alabama, and picking back up in South Florida around the Everglades, with its center in New Orleans, Louisiana. The term may also be associated with the homelands of certain Choctaw tribal groups.

Houston has the nickname "Bayou City".  "bye-you"  is the most common pronunciation, while a few use "bye-oh" , although that pronunciation is declining.

Environmental Risks 
Bayous are susceptible to pollution such as runoff from nearby urban communities (which can result in eutrophication) and oil spills. Many bayous have been cleared away by human activity as well (with those in Louisiana having shrunk by 4,900 square kilometers since the 1930s).

Notable examples

 Bayou Bartholomew
 Bayou Corne
 Bayou La Batre
 Bayou Lafourche
 Bayou St. John
 Bayou Teche
 Big Bayou Canot
 Buffalo Bayou
 Cypress Bayou

See also

References

External links 

Fluvial landforms
Lagoons
Wetlands
.
.
Bayou
.Bayou
.Bayou
.Bayou
.Bayou
.Bayou